This is a list of rural localities in Primorsky Krai. Primorsky Krai, informally known as Primorye, is the Russian name for a province of Russia. Primorsky means "maritime" in Russian, so in English translation it is sometimes known as the Maritime Province or Maritime Territory. Its administrative center is in the city of Vladivostok. The region's population is 1,956,497 (2010 Census).

Locations 
 12th km
 53rd km
 Agzu

 Anuchino
 Barabash

 Baykal
 Bezverkhovo
 Chernigovka

 Chuguyevka
 Dersu

 Galyonki

 Gorny
 Kamen-Rybolov

 Khorol
 Mikhaylovka

 Narva

 Novaya Moskva
 Novonikolsk
 Novopokrovka
 Peretychikha

 Pokrovka
 Rudnaya Pristan

 Rudny
 Trudovoye

 Varfolomeyevka

 Vladimiro-Alexandrovskoye
 Volno-Nadezhdinskoye
 Vysokogorsk
 Yakovlevka

See also
 
 Lists of rural localities in Russia

References

Primorsky Krai